The 2019 Thailand Masters (officially known as the Princess Sirivannavari Thailand Masters 2019 presented by Toyota for sponsorship reasons) was a badminton tournament which took place at Indoor Stadium Huamark in Thailand from 8 to 13 January 2019 and had a total purse of $150,000.

Tournament
The 2019 Thailand Masters was the first tournament of the 2019 BWF World Tour and also part of the Thailand Masters championships which had been held since 2016. This tournament was organized by the Badminton Association of Thailand with sanction from the BWF.

Venue
This international tournament was held at Indoor Stadium Huamark in Bangkok, Thailand.

Point distribution
Below is the point distribution table for each phase of the tournament based on the BWF points system for the BWF World Tour Super 300 event.

Prize money
The total prize money for this tournament was US$150,000. Distribution of prize money was in accordance with BWF regulations.

Men's singles

Seeds

 Lin Dan (final)
 Khosit Phetpradab (first round)
 Kantaphon Wangcharoen (first round)
 Suppanyu Avihingsanon (first round)
 Jan Ø. Jørgensen (withdrew)
 Wang Tzu-wei (quarter-finals)
 Brice Leverdez (semi-finals)
 Lu Guangzu (semi-finals)

Finals

Top half

Section 1

Section 2

Bottom half

Section 3

Section 4

Women's singles

Seeds

 Nitchaon Jindapol (second round)
 Gao Fangjie (withdrew)
 Michelle Li (quarter-finals)
 Cai Yanyan (second round)
 Line Kjærsfeldt (withdrew)
 Pornpawee Chochuwong (semi-finals)
 Cheung Ngan Yi (second round)
 Busanan Ongbamrungphan (final)

Finals

Top half

Section 1

Section 2

Bottom half

Section 3

Section 4

Men's doubles

Seeds

 Goh V Shem / Tan Wee Kiong (champions)
 Aaron Chia / Soh Wooi Yik (second round)
 Ou Xuanyi / Ren Xiangyu (withdrew)
 Wahyu Nayaka / Ade Yusuf (second round)
 Lu Ching-yao / Yang Po-han (final)
 Ong Yew Sin / Teo Ee Yi (quarter-finals)
 Jelle Maas / Robin Tabeling (second round)
 Mohamad Arif Abdul Latif / Nur Mohd Azriyn Ayub (quarter-finals)

Finals

Top half

Section 1

Section 2

Bottom half

Section 3

Section 4

Women's doubles

Seeds

 Jongkolphan Kititharakul / Rawinda Prajongjai (quarter-finals)
 Nami Matsuyama / Chiharu Shida (quarter-finals)
 Chayanit Chaladchalam / Phataimas Muenwong (quarter-finals)
 Émilie Lefel / Anne Tran (second round)
 Li Wenmei / Zheng Yu (final)
 Selena Piek / Cheryl Seinen (semi-finals)
 Ekaterina Bolotova / Alina Davletova (semi-finals)
 Gronya Somerville / Setyana Mapasa (withdrew)

Finals

Top half

Section 1

Section 2

Bottom half

Section 3

Section 4

Mixed doubles

Seeds

 Chan Peng Soon / Goh Liu Ying (champions)
 Dechapol Puavaranukroh / Sapsiree Taerattanachai (final)
 Lu Kai / Chen Lu (withdrew)
 Akbar Bintang Cahyono / Winny Oktavina Kandow (quarter-finals)
 Ronald Alexander / Annisa Saufika (second round)
 Nipitphon Phuangphuapet / Savitree Amitrapai (semi-finals)
 Chen Tang Jie / Peck Yen Wei (second round)
 Tang Chun Man / Ng Tsz Yau (semi-finals)

Finals

Top half

Section 1

Section 2

Bottom half

Section 3

Section 4

References

External links
 Tournament Link

Thailand Masters
Badminton, World Tour, Thailand Masters
Badminton, World Tour, Thailand Masters
Thailand Masters (badminton)
Badminton, World Tour, Thailand Masters